Promicromonospora kroppenstedtii is a bacterium from the genus Promicromonospora which has been isolated from sandy soil from Zamora, Spain.

References

Further reading

External links
Type strain of Promicromonospora kroppenstedtii at BacDive -  the Bacterial Diversity Metadatabase	

Micrococcales
Bacteria described in 2008